Elkington & Co. was a silver manufacturer from Birmingham, England.

History 

It was founded by George Richards Elkington and his cousin, Henry Elkington, in the 1830s. It operated under the name G. R. Elkington & Co. until 1842, when a third partner, Josiah Mason, joined the firm. It operated as Elkington, Mason, & Co. until 1861, when the partnership with Mason was terminated. The firm operated independently as Elkington & Co. from 1861 until 1963. It was then taken over by British Silverware, Ltd.. In 1971 British Silverware, Ltd. became a subsidiary of Delta Metal Co. Ltd.

Over the course of history it became very successful and was one of the prime producers of silver plating. Elkington received various royal warrants of appointments, and also an Imperial and Royal Warrant of Appointment from the emperor of Austria. One of their most famous pieces is the electrotype copy of the Jerningham Wine Cooler, at the Victoria & Albert Museum.

References

Further reading
 Extensive discussion of Elkington & Co..

External links 

Defunct companies based in Birmingham, West Midlands
manufacturing companies based in Birmingham, West Midlands
Silversmiths
British Royal Warrant holders
Italian Royal Warrant holders
Purveyors to the Imperial and Royal Court